Cha Hui-rim (born 1953) is a North Korean politician. He is a candidate member of the Central Committee of the Workers' Party of Korea and chairman of the People's Committee of Pyongyang.

Biography
He was born in 1953. He was elected as secretary of the WPK Pyongyang Party Committee in October 2011 after passing through the organizational secretary of the Ministry of Water and Construction. In September 2012, he was appointed chairman of the People's Committee of Pyongyang City as a successor to Ryang Man-gil. In November 2012, he was a member of the National Sports Coaching Committee. He was elected to the 13th convocation of the Supreme People's Assembly and was appointed a member of its Legislative Committee. In May 2016, at the 7th Congress of the Workers' Party of Korea he was elected as a candidate member for the Central Committee of the Workers' Party of Korea. In April 2017, he was promoted to full member. As of January 2020 he is the state official in charge of Pyongyang

References

Pyongyang
Workers' Party of Korea politicians
Members of the Supreme People's Assembly
1953 births
Living people